The DF-ZF is a Chinese hypersonic glide vehicle (HGV), previously denoted by the Pentagon as WU-14 and currently officially operational on October 1st, 2019, in the 70th anniversary of the People's Republic of China. The DF-ZF is designed to be mounted on a DF-17, a type of ballistic missile specifically designed to carry HGVs.

Testing
The DF-ZF, designated by Pentagon as the WU-14, is a hypersonic missile delivery vehicle that has been flight-tested by China seven times, on 9 January, 7 August and 2 December 2014; 7 June and 27 November 2015; in April 2016 and twice in November 2017. The system is operational as of 2019.

The Chinese Defense Ministry confirmed its January 2014 test and said the test was "scientific" in nature, although it was widely viewed as part of a broader Chinese military build-up. All seven tests China performed so far were concluded successfully according to U.S. officials cited in The Washington Free Beacon. All the test launches were performed at the Taiyuan Satellite Launch Center in Shanxi Province, the main long-range missile testing center for the People's Liberation Army.

Capabilities and design
The DF-ZF is thought to reach speeds between Mach 5 and Mach 10. The glider could be used for nuclear weapons delivery but could also be used to perform precision-strike conventional missions (for example, next-generation anti-ship ballistic missiles), which could penetrate "the layered air defenses of a U.S. carrier strike group."

Hypersonic glider vehicles are less susceptible to anti-ballistic missile countermeasures than conventional reentry vehicles (RVs).  Normal RVs descend through the atmosphere on a predictable ballistic trajectory—a hypersonic glider like the HGV can pull-up after reentering the atmosphere and approach its target in a relatively flat glide, lessening the time it can be detected, fired at, or reengaged if an initial attack fails.  Gliding makes it more maneuverable and extends its range. Although gliding creates more drag, it flies further than it would on a higher trajectory through space, and is too low to be intercepted by exo-atmospheric kill vehicles. The tradeoff is that warheads have less speed and altitude as they near the target, making them vulnerable to lower-tier interceptors, such as the Mach 17 Russian 53T6, ABM-3 Gazelle. Other potential counter-hypersonic interception measures may involve laser or railgun technologies, but such technologies are not currently available.

A vehicle like the DF-ZF could be fitted to various Chinese ballistic missiles, such as the DF-21 medium-range missile (extending range from ), and the DF-31 intercontinental ballistic missiles (extending range from ). Analysts suspect that the DF-ZF will first be used in shorter-range roles as an anti-ship missile and for other tactical purposes to address the problem of hitting a moving target with a ballistic missile. Long-term goals may include deterrence of U.S. missile capabilities with the prospect of strategic bombardment against the United States, or other countries. 

Since conventional interceptor missiles have difficulty against maneuvering targets traveling faster than Mach 5 (the DF-ZF reenters the atmosphere at Mach 10), a problem exacerbated by decreased detection times, the United States may place more importance on developing directed-energy weapons as a countermeasure. However, after decades of research and development, directed-energy weapons are still very much at the experimental stage and it remains to be seen if or when they will be deployed as practical, high-performance military weapons.

Complaints have been raised by one researcher over lack of access to high-performance computing power, required for development of the HGV. While China has a number of high performance supercomputers, access to them was not provided for the DF-ZF development project.

See also

 Avangard – a Russian hypersonic warhead
 Hypersonic Technology Vehicle 2 and Advanced Hypersonic Weapon – a similar US test vehicle and warhead
 HGV-202F - an Indian Hypersonic glide vehicle
 HYFLEX – a Japanese Hypersonic Flight Experiment
 Hypersonic Technology Demonstrator Vehicle – an Indian hypersonic vehicle under development
 Long-Range Hypersonic Weapon
 DARPA Falcon Project – Prompt Global Strike 
 Rockwell X-30, 1990–1993 project for SSTO prototype
 Boeing X-51 Waverider
 Hypersonic Flight Experiment
 IXV
 Shaurya (missile)
 Kh-47M2 Kinzhal

References

2010s Chinese experimental aircraft
Chinese experimental aircraft
Cruise missiles of the People's Republic of China
Hypersonic aircraft
Unmanned experimental aircraft
Military equipment introduced in the 2010s